A forced landing is a landing by an aircraft made under factors outside the pilot's control, such as the failure of engines, systems, components, or weather which makes continued flight impossible. However, the term also means a landing that has been forced by interception.

A plane may be compelled to land through the use, or threat of use, of force, if it strays off course into hostile foreign territory. The Chicago Convention on International Civil Aviation contains guidance in Annex 2 on "Signals for Use in the Event of Interception": customarily for the military plane approaches the airliner from below and to the left, where his plane is easily visible from the left seat where the captain sits. The intercepting plane waggles his wings to signal the demand to be followed.

Territorial airspace is under the sovereignty of the relevant state, and their domestic law would regulate the treatment of intruding aircraft. Consequences could include:

See also
 Deadstick landing
 Hard landing

References

External links
 

Types of landing
Aviation accidents and incidents